This is a list of airports in Réunion, sorted by location.

Réunion is an island and overseas department (or DOM) of France, located in the Indian Ocean east of Madagascar, about 200 km southwest of Mauritius, the nearest island.



Airports 

ICAO location identifiers are linked to each airport's Aeronautical Information Publication (AIP), which are available online in Portable Document Format (PDF) from the French Service d'information aéronautique (SIA). Locations shown in bold are as per the airport's AIP page. Most airports give two locations: the first is the city served, second is the city where the airport is located.

Airport names shown in bold indicate the airport has scheduled service on commercial airlines.

See also 
 List of airports in France
 List of airports by ICAO code: F#FM - Comoros, Mayotte, Réunion, and Madagascar
 Wikipedia: Airline destination lists: Africa#Réunion (France)

References 
 Aeronautical Information Service / Service d'information aéronautique (SIA) 
 Aeronautical Information Publications (AIP) 
 Union des Aéroports Français 
 
  - includes IATA codes
 Great Circle Mapper: Airports in Réunion - IATA and ICAO codes
 World Aero Data: Airports in Réunion - ICAO codes

 
Airports
Reunion
Reunion